Mark Heyman (born 1979) is an American screenwriter and film producer who is best known for co-writing Black Swan (2010) and The Skeleton Twins (2014).

Early life
Heyman grew up in New Mexico. He attended Brown University, where he majored in modern culture and media. After graduating from Brown in 2002, he enrolled in New York University's film program as a graduate student.

After graduating from New York University, Heyman was as a director of development for Prøtøzøa Pictures, the production company of filmmaker Darren Aronofsky. He was subsequently credited as a co-producer on Aronofsky's 2008 film The Wrestler about an aging wrestler. After working on The Wrestler, Heyman decided to give up producing films in favor of writing them. He and Aronofsky went on to write Black Swan, which was directed by Aronofsky and released in 2010, based on a script called The Understudy by Andres Heinz. Black Swan was well received by critics and audiences, and Heyman received nominations for a BAFTA Award for Best Original Screenplay and a Writers Guild of America Award for Best Original Screenplay.

Heyman co-wrote The Skeleton Twins, a 2014 film starring Kristen Wiig and Bill Hader as estranged twins, with Craig Johnson, who also directed the film. He has also written a screenplay titled XOXO, which is a thriller about a relationship formed on Facebook and is set to be produced by Aronofsky. In 2015, it was reported that Heyman had been hired to write a film adaptation of How to Catch a Russian Spy, a novel by Naveed Jamali and Ellis Henican, to be directed by Marc Webb.

Heyman wrote the screenplay for 2023's The Boogeyman.

References

External links

Living people
1979 births
American film producers
Brown University alumni
New York University alumni
Writers from New Mexico
Screenwriters from New Mexico